Lewis Allsopp (after 1763–1835) was a British Tory politician and attorney. He served as Member of Parliament for Camelford between 17 April 1819 and 16 June 1819. According to Hansard records, he never made a spoken or written contribution in Parliament during this time.

He also served as Solicitor to the Dutchy of Cornwall.

References 

Members of the Parliament of the United Kingdom for Camelford
Tory members of the Parliament of the United Kingdom
Members of Parliament for constituencies in Cornwall
UK MPs 1818–1820
1835 deaths
Politicians from Nottingham

1763 births
English solicitors